Dirt Track Racing 2 (DTR2) is a video game developed by the now defunct Ratbag Games and published by Infogrames. It is the third and final game in the Dirt Track Racing series by Ratbag.

Reception

The game received "average" reviews according to the review aggregation website Metacritic.

References

External links
 

2002 video games
Racing video games
Video games developed in Australia
Windows games
Windows-only games
Infogrames games
Multiplayer and single-player video games